Reena Saini Kallat (born 1973) is an Indian visual artist. She currently lives and works in Mumbai.

Early life
Reena Saini Kallat was born in 1973 in Delhi, India. She graduated from Sir Jamsetjee Jeejebhoy School of Art in 1996 with a B.F.A. in painting. Her practice spanning drawing, photography, sculpture and video engages diverse materials, imbued with conceptual underpinnings. Her works reference history, collective memory and identity. Using the motif of the rubberstamp both as object and imprint, signifying the bureaucratic apparatus, Reena has worked with officially recorded or registered names of people, objects, and monuments that are lost or have disappeared without a trace, only to get listed as anonymous and forgotten statistics. Lines of Control is a recurring element in her works led by the impact that partition had on her family who were displaced from Lahore. In her works made with electrical cables, wires usually serving as conduits of contact that transmit ideas and information, become painstakingly woven entanglements that morph into barbed wires like barriers, while another series where she uses salt as a medium explores the tenuous yet intrinsic relationship between the body and the oceans, highlighting the fragility and unpredictability of existence. To expose the arbitrariness of territorial-skirmishes, Reena frequently draws attention to ecosystems and indigenous vegetation.

Career
She has widely exhibited across the world in venues such as Museum of Modern Art (MOMA), New York; Migros Museum of Contemporary Art, Zurich; Tate Modern, London; Art Gallery of New South Wales, Sydney; Mori Art Museum, Tokyo; Kennedy Centre, Washington; Vancouver Art Gallery; Saatchi Gallery, London; SESC Pompeia and SESC Belenzino in São Paulo; Goteborgs Konsthall, Sweden; Helsinki City Art Museum, Finland; National Taiwan Museum of Fine Arts; Tel Aviv Museum of Art, Israel; National Museum of Contemporary Art, Seoul; Henie Onstad Kunstsenter, Oslo; Casa Asia, Madrid and Barcelona; ZKM Karlsruhe in Germany; Campbelltown Arts Centre, Sydney; Hangar Bicocca, Milan; Museum of Contemporary Art, Shanghai; IVAM Museum, Spain; Busan MOMA; Kulturhuset, Stockholm; Kunsthaus Langenthal, Switzerland; Chicago Cultural Centre amongst many others. She lives and works in Mumbai.

Select solo exhibitions

 Orchard of Home-grown Secrets, Gallery Chemould, Mumbai and Pundole Art Gallery, Mumbai (1998)
 Skin, Gallery Chemould, Mumbai and Art Inc. Gallery, New Delhi (2000)
 Seven Faces of Dust, Chicago Radio, Mumbai (2002)
 The Battlefield Is The Mind, Sakshi Gallery, Bangalore (2002)
 Black Flute, Gallery Chemould, Mumbai 2004
 Black Flute (And Other Stories), Nature Morte, New Delhi (2005)
 Rainbow Of Refuse, Bodhi Art Gallery, Mumbai (2006)
 Subject to Change without Notice, Walsh Gallery, Chicago (2008)
 Silt of Seasons, Chemould Prescott Road, Mumbai (2008)
 Drift, Primo Marella Gallery, Milan (2009)
 Labyrinth of Absences, Nature Morte, New Delhi (2011)
 Anatomy of forking paths, Art Houz, Art Chennai (2014)
 ZegnArt Public project with Dr. Bhaudaji Lad Museum, Mumbai (2013)
 Falling Fables, part of Maximum India at the Kennedy Centre, Washington 2011
 Offsite, Public Art Project, Vancouver Art Gallery (2015)
 Porous Passages, Nature Morte, New Delhi
 Hyphenated Lives, Chemould Prescott Road, Mumbai
 Blind Spots, Chemould Prescott Road, Mumbai
Shifting Ecotones, Moca London, London (2019)
 Common Ground, Compton Verney, Warwickshire (2022)
Leaking Lines, Firstsite, Colchester (2022)

Select group exhibitions
 Varsha ’95, Y. B. Chavan Gallery, Mumbai (1995)
 Monsoon Show, Jehangir Art Gallery, Mumbai (1996)
 Fresh Work,  Birla Academy of Art and Culture, Mumbai (1997)
 Essays in Time, Kinetic Sculptures, Nehru Centre, Mumbai (1998)
 Edge of the Century, Academy of Fine Arts and Literature, New Delhi (1999)
 AOM- Art on the move, New Delhi (2001)
 Big River 2, CCA7 Gallery, Port Of Spain, Trinidad (2001)
 Crossing Borders, Gallery Windkracht 13, Den Helder, Holland (2002)
 Reclaim Our Freedom, Pundole Art Gallery, Mumbai (2002)
 Crosscurrents, Jehangir Art Gallery, Mumbai (2002)
 Contemporary Art from India, Oslo, Norway (2003)
 Indians + Cowboys, Gallery 4A, Sydney (2003)
 Tiranga, India Habitat Centre, New Delhi (2003)
 Hard Copy, Gallery 88, Calcutta (2003) 
 Crossing generations: diVERGE, National Gallery of Modern Art, Mumbai (2003)
 Zoom! Art in Contemporary India, The Culturgest Museum, Lisbon, Portugal (2004)
 Contemporary Art from India, Thomas Erben Gallery, New York (2004)
 Indian Paintings of the New Millennium, Thomas J. Walsh Art Gallery, Fairfield University, USA (2005)
 Span, Sakshi Gallery, Mumbai (2005)
 Mom and Pop Art, Walsh Gallery, Chicago (2005)
 India Express – Art and Popular Culture, Art Museum Tennispalace, (2006)
 Hungry God- Indian Contemporary Art, Arario Gallery, Beijing and Busan MoMA (2006)
 Lille 3000 (Maximum City-Mumbai), Lille, France (2006)
 Modern Indian Works On Paper, Arthur Ross Gallery, Philadelphia and the Georgia Museum of Art, USA (2006)
 Thermocline Of Art- New Asian Waves, Center for Art and Media Karlsruhe, Germany (2007)
 New Narratives: Contemporary Art From India, Chicago Cultural Centre, Chicago (2007)
 INDIA NOW: Contemporary Indian Art, Between Continuity and transformation, Spazio Oberdan, Milan (2007)
 Urban Manners, at Hangar Bicocca, Milan (2007)
 Soft Power: Asian Attitude, Shanghai Zendai Museum of Modern Art, Shanghai (2007)
 Incheon Women Artists’ Biennale, Incheon, South Korea (2007)
 Excavation: Memory/Myth/Membrane, Museum Gallery, Mumbai (2008)
 Three Points of view, Galerie Mirchandani + Steinrucke, Mumbai (2008)
 3rd Nanjing Triennale, China (2008)
 India Moderna, IVAM Museum, Valencia, Spain (2008)
 Chalo! India: A New Era of Indian Art, Mori Art Museum, Japan (2008)
 Indian Narratives in the 21st Century: Between Memory and History, Casa Asia, Madrid and Barcelona, Spain (2009)
 Low Blow: And Other Species of Confusion, Stux gallery, New York (2009)
 INDIA XIANZAI: Contemporary Indian Art, Museum of Contemporary Art Shanghai (2009)
 Ventosul Biennale, Curitiba, Brazil (2009)
 Milan Galleria, Triennale Museum, Milan (2009)
 View Points and Viewing points – Asian Art Biennale, National Taiwan Museum of Fine Arts (2009)
 Urban Manners 2, Contemporary Artists from India, SESC Pompeia, São Paulo, Brazil (2010)
 The Empire Strikes Back, Saatchi Gallery, London (2010)
 In Transition: New Art from India, Vancouver International Sculpture Biennale, Vancouver (2010) 
 Roundabout, Tel Aviv Museum of Art, Israel (2011)
 Pandemonium: Art in a Time of Creativity Fever, Goteborg International Biennale for Contemporary Art, (2011)
 Maximum India, The John F. Kennedy Center for the Performing Arts, Washington (2011)
 Samtidigt, Helsinki City Art Museum, Finland] (2011)
 India: Art Now, Arken Museum of Modern Art, Copenhagen, Denmark (2012)
 JJ's 90s – The Time of Change, Mumbai Sir J.J. School of Art, Mumbai] (2013)
 Aesthetic Bind: Floating World, Chemould Prescott Road, Mumbai (2014)
 The Eye and The Mind: New Interventions in Indian Art, Minsheng Art Museum, Beijing
 Aperture, Indian Summer Festival, Old Canadian Pacific Railway Station, Vancouver
 The Eye and The Mind: New Interventions in Indian Art, China Art Museum, Shanghai
 A Summer Mix, Chemould Prescott Road, Mumbai
 One and one make eleven (Contemporary Art From India), Kunsthaus Langenthal, Switzerland (2015)
 The Eye and The Mind: New Interventions in Indian Art, Guangdong Museum of Art, Guangzhou, China (2015)
 [en]counters 2015, Spaces in Transition, CST Terminus, Mumbai(2015)
 Kalaghoda Art Festival, Mumbai(2015)
 Insecurities: tracing Displacement and Shelter, organized by Sean Anderson and Ariele Dionne-Krosnick, The Museum of Modern Art, New York >>
 Hybridizing Earth, Discussing Multitude, 10th Busan Biennale, curated by Cheagab Yun, Kiswire Suyeong factory, Busan, South Korea (2016)
 Conceiving Space, Colombo Art Biennial, curated by Alnoor Mitha, Sri Lanka(2016)
 Make a Change, curated by Torun Ekstrand, Cultural Ronneby, Sweden(2016)
 Tabiyat: Medicine and Healing in India, curated by Ratan Vaswani, CSMVS (Chhatrapati Shivaji Maharaj Vastu Sangrahalaya), Mumbai(2016)
 The Eye and The Mind: New Interventions in Indian Art, NGMA- Jaipur House, New Delhi(2016)
The Idea of the Acrobat, Bikaner House, New Delhi (2020)

Artist residencies
In 2002 Kallat was an artist-in-residence in the Laurentian mountains of Quebec at the Boreal Art and Nature Centre in Canada. In 2011 she was awarded an IASPIS residency to work and study in Gothenburg, Sweden.

Awards
Kallat has been the recipient of a number of awards, including:

 Gladstone Solomon Award (1995)
 Bombay Art Society Merit Certificate (1996)
 Second Prize Government Award, Sir Jamsetjee Jeejebhoy School of Art (1996)
 Harmony Award (2005)
 YFLO ZOYA Young Women Achievers Awards 2010-11, Delhi (2011)
 ZegnArt Public Award in collaboration with Dr. Bhaudaji Lad Museum, Mumbai (2012)
 Zee: Indian Women Awards in Arts & Culture category, Delhi (2016)

Collections

Reena's work is held in the following public and private collections:
National Taiwan Museum of Fine Arts, Taiwan
Vancouver Art Gallery, Canada
Dr. Bhau Daji Lad City Museum, Mumbai
National Gallery of Modern Art, New Delhi
Art Gallery of New South Wales, Sydney, Australia
Manchester Museum, UK
Kiran Nadar Museum of Art, New Delhi
Norrtalje Konsthall, Sweden
Musee de Beaux Arts, Ottawa, Canada

References

External links

Gallery Chemould, Mumbai
Nature Morte, New Delhi

1973 births
Living people
20th-century Indian women artists
21st-century Indian women artists
21st-century Indian painters
Indian women painters
Sir Jamsetjee Jeejebhoy School of Art alumni
Indian women contemporary artists
Indian contemporary painters
Painters from Delhi
Women artists from Delhi